Champany Inn is a restaurant in Champany, a hamlet on the junctions of the A904 and A803 roads near Linlithgow, West Lothian, Scotland. , the restaurant holds one star in the Michelin Guide.

References 

Restaurants in Scotland
Michelin Guide starred restaurants in the United Kingdom
West Lothian